Troy Michael Kotsur (born July 24, 1968) is an American actor in theater, film, and television.

His supporting role in the film CODA (2021) earned him a number of accolades, including an Academy Award, a British Academy Film Award, a Screen Actors Guild Award, and a Critics' Choice Movie Award. He is the first deaf actor to win the latter three awards, and first deaf man and second deaf performer overall to win the former.

Kotsur also directed the feature film No Ordinary Hero: The SuperDeafy Movie (2013).

Early life and education 
Kotsur was born in Mesa, Arizona, the largest suburb of Phoenix, on July 24, 1968, to JoDee (née True) and Leonard Stephen "Len" Kotsur, who was Mesa's police chief. When Kotsur was nine months old, his parents discovered that he was deaf, and they learned American Sign Language so the family could communicate. His parents encouraged Kotsur to play sports and to make friends with hearing children in their neighborhood. Kotsur attended the Phoenix Day School for the Deaf, where he first became interested in acting. He graduated from Westwood High School. In high school, his drama teacher encouraged him to participate in the senior variety show, and he performed a pantomime skit that was positively received and motivated him to pursue theater.

After Kotsur graduated from high school, he interned at KTSP-TV (now KSAZ-TV). While he had aspired to direct films, at the internship he assisted an editor and did not feel connected with people, recalling, "My directing dream poofed after I accepted the fact that I lived in a world that did not use my language." He then attended Gallaudet University from 1987 to 1989 and studied theater, television, and film.

Career 
When Kotsur received an acting job offer from the National Theatre of the Deaf, he accepted it and left Gallaudet to tour with NTD for two years, performing in two plays. In 1994, he started working for the Deaf West Theatre in Los Angeles, California, acting in and directing several productions. On stage, his roles included Stanley in A Streetcar Named Desire, Lenny in Of Mice and Men, and Prince Hamlet in Ophelia.

In 2001, Kotsur and hearing actor Lyle Kanouse were cast together in a Deaf West Theatre production of the 1985 musical Big River. Kotsur and Kanouse both played Huckleberry Finn's father Pap, with Kotsur signing and Kanouse speaking and singing. Big Rivers success led to the play being performed at the Mark Taper Forum, then to a Broadway revival under Roundabout Theater Company and Deaf West at the American Airlines Theater in New York City. He also had a recurring role on Sue Thomas: F.B.Eye, also working as an ASL specialist for the show.

In 2012, Kotsur starred in the play Cyrano, based on Cyrano de Bergerac and a co-production of Deaf West Theatre and The Fountain Theatre. The play, directed by Stephen Sachs, premiered in April 2012. Following Cyrano, Kotsur directed the feature film No Ordinary Hero: The SuperDeafy Movie, which premiered at the Heartland Film Festival in 2013.

In 2016 he starred in Deborah LaVine's independent feature, Wild Prairie Rose. The film won the Jimmy Stewart Legacy award at the Heartland International Film Festival.

In The Mandalorian, the Tusken Raiders use a sign language, and Kotsur was brought on to develop that conlang. He did not mention that he was also an actor for fear that it would come across as brown-nosing. But after they found out from his manager, he was cast to play the lead Tusken Raider.

In 2021, Kotsur appeared in the feature film CODA in a supporting role as the deaf father to a hearing teenage daughter. Director Sian Heder first saw his performances in Deaf West productions of Our Town and Edward Albee's At Home at the Zoo and cast him as part of the ensemble. NPR reported that Kotsur's performance in CODA "awed both audiences and critics". For his performance in the film, Kotsur won the Academy Award for Best Supporting Actor, becoming the second deaf actor, after Marlee Matlin (his CODA co-star) in Children of a Lesser God (1986), to win an Academy Award.

Kotsur is set to star in Flash Before the Bang, a sports drama television show with an all-deaf cast.

Personal life 
Kotsur is married to actress Deanne Bray, who is also deaf, with whom he has one daughter.

Filmography

Film

Television

Theatre credits

Accolades

References

External links 
 

Living people
1968 births
21st-century American male actors
American male film actors
American male television actors
American male deaf actors
American male stage actors
Best Supporting Actor BAFTA Award winners
Male actors from Phoenix, Arizona
Outstanding Performance by a Cast in a Motion Picture Screen Actors Guild Award winners
People from Mesa, Arizona
Best Supporting Actor Academy Award winners
Deaf culture
American deaf people